Eastern Lapland is a subdivision of Finnish Lapland and one of the sub-regions of Finland since 2009.

Eastern Lapland lies along the Russian border in northern Finland. , it has a population of 15,808, a decrease of 31% since 2000; it is a rural and sparsely populated area. Outward migration and unemployment have increased in the region since the closure of an electronics factor and the decline of the pulp industry.

Municipalities
 Kemijärvi
 Pelkosenniemi
 Posio
 Salla
 Savukoski

Politics
Results of the 2018 Finnish presidential election:

 Sauli Niinistö   54.3%
 Paavo Väyrynen   16.2%
 Matti Vanhanen   10.5%
 Merja Kyllönen   5.9%
 Laura Huhtasaari   5.6%
 Pekka Haavisto   4.7%
 Tuula Haatainen   2.7%
 Nils Torvalds   0.3%

References 

Sub-regions of Finland
Lapland (Finland)